The 1994 Brandenburg state election was held on 11 September 1994 to elect the members of the 2nd Landtag of Brandenburg. The incumbent government was a traffic light coalition of the Social Democratic Party (SPD), Free Democratic Party (FDP) and The Greens, led by Minister-President Manfred Stolpe. The SPD achieved a 16% swing in its favour and won an absolute majority with 54% of the vote, while both of its coalition partners lost their seats. The Christian Democratic Union (CDU) suffered a major swing against it, falling to 18.7%. The Party of Democratic Socialism (PDS) also finished on 18.7%, just 62 votes behind the CDU. Minister-President Stolpe continued in office.

This election marked the first and last time that a party gained an absolute majority in Brandenburg. In addition, this was also the first and last time that a party won all single-member constituencies (44).

Parties
The table below lists parties represented in the 1st Landtag of Brandenburg.

Election result

|-
! colspan="2" | Party
! Votes
! %
! +/-
! Seats 
! +/-
! Seats %
|-
| bgcolor=| 
| align=left | Social Democratic Party (SPD)
| align=right| 580,422
| align=right| 54.1
| align=right| 15.9
| align=right| 52
| align=right| 16
| align=right| 59.1
|-
| bgcolor=| 
| align=left | Christian Democratic Union (CDU)
| align=right| 200,700
| align=right| 18.7
| align=right| 10.7
| align=right| 18
| align=right| 9
| align=right| 20.5
|-
| bgcolor=| 
| align=left | Party of Democratic Socialism (PDS)
| align=right| 200,628
| align=right| 18.7
| align=right| 5.3
| align=right| 18
| align=right| 5
| align=right| 20.5
|-
! colspan=8|
|-
| bgcolor=| 
| align=left | Alliance 90/The Greens (Grüne)
| align=right| 31,033
| align=right| 2.9
| align=right| 6.3
| align=right| 0
| align=right| 6
| align=right| 0
|-
| bgcolor=| 
| align=left | Free Democratic Party (FDP)
| align=right| 23,541
| align=right| 2.2
| align=right| 4.4
| align=right| 0
| align=right| 6
| align=right| 0
|-
| bgcolor=|
| align=left | Others
| align=right| 35,685
| align=right| 3.3
| align=right| 
| align=right| 0
| align=right| ±0
| align=right| 0
|-
! align=right colspan=2| Total
! align=right| 1,072,009
! align=right| 100.0
! align=right| 
! align=right| 88
! align=right| ±0
! align=right| 
|-
! align=right colspan=2| Voter turnout
! align=right| 
! align=right| 56.3
! align=right| 10.8
! align=right| 
! align=right| 
! align=right| 
|}

Notes

Sources
 Amtliches Endergebnis der Landtagswahl in Brandenburg 1994

Elections in Brandenburg
Brandenburg
September 1994 events in Europe